Paracorymbia is a genus of beetles belonging to the family Cerambycidae.

Species
The following species are recognised in the genus Paracorymbia:
 Paracorymbia fulva (Degeer, 1775) 
 Paracorymbia hybrida (Rey, 1885)
 Paracorymbia maculicornis (Degeer, 1775)
 Paracorymbia otini (Peyerimhoff, 1949)
 Paracorymbia simplonica (Fairmaire, 1885)
 Paracorymbia stragulata (Germar, 1824)

References

Cerambycidae
Cerambycidae genera